Livin' Legend is the sixth studio album and the first album by American rapper B.G. since departing from Cash Money Records and is also his first release under his own imprint Chopper City Records. The album contains production from Kenoe, K.I.D.D., Clinton Sparks, and Beat Doctor. B.G. also introduces his artists, Gar, Hakizzle and Snipe to the world. "Let It Flow", "Keep It Gangsta", and "Fuck You" were released on vinyl. A music video for "Keep It Gangsta" and "Hottest of the Hot" was released in summer 2003.

Track listing

Charts

Weekly charts

Year-end charts

References

2003 albums
B.G. (rapper) albums